The Kyles of Bute form a narrow sea channel that separates the northern end of the Isle of Bute from the Cowal peninsula in Argyll and Bute, on the Scottish mainland. The surrounding hillsides are roughly wooded, and overlooked by rocky tops and areas of moorland.

The Kyles are split into the East and West Kyles. The East Kyle runs from Rothesay Bay north west up to the entrance to Loch Riddon. Here at the northern end of the East Kyle are the Burnt Islands and the island of Eilean Dubh. The West Kyle runs from here southwest, past the village of Tighnabruaich out to the Sound of Bute. The area is a designated National Scenic Area.

The Kyles are reflected in the name of Tighnabruaich-based Shinty team Kyles Athletic.

Transport
The crossing takes only 5 minutes, and runs every half hour throughout the day, seven days a week. Due to her size relative to the short crossing the ferry normally sails with both ramps unfolded. As the crossing is so short the issue of whether the ferry should be replaced by a bridge has been discussed a number of times, for example by Highlands and Islands Enterprise in 1995.

The A8003 road runs above the West Kyle, reaching a height of  just north of Tighnabruaich. On the mainland shore of the East Kyle the A886 road also takes a route above the shoreline, however the B866 road runs closer to the shore of Loch Riddon. The A and B roads meet just north of Colintraive, from where the route of the A886 continues over the ferry to run along the east shore of Bute to Rothesay.

Tourism
A trip through the Kyles of Bute was a common feature of a trip "doon the watter" on a Clyde steamer during the late nineteenth and early twentieth centuries. The Kyles are also very popular for yachting, and there are many sheltered anchorages.

The Cowal Way, a waymarked footpath between Tighnabruaich and Tarbet, follows the shoreline of the West Kyle, below the A8003. The West Island Way, a waymarked footpath on the Isle of Bute, follows the western shore of the East Kyle for a section of its northern loop: this section is along the A886. Both routes are officially designated as being among Scotland's Great Trails.

The Kyles form part of an area marketed for tourism purposes as "Argyll's Secret Coast".

Conservation
The area is designated as the Kyles of Bute National Scenic Area, one of the forty such areas in Scotland, which are defined so as to identify areas of exceptional scenery and to ensure its protection from inappropriate development.

Bird species that can regularly be seen in the Kyles include eider ducks, oystercatchers and herons.

Further north, Eilean Dearg in Loch Riddon is the site of a Medieval castle that was destroyed by naval action during Argyll's Rising in 1685.

Ownership

The eastern shores of the East Kyle forms the Ardentraive Estate, which is owned by the Mount Stuart Trust, which also owns Mount Stuart House, and most of the Isle of Bute (including the eastern shoreline of the West Kyle). The Mount Stuart Trust is still largely controlled by the family of the Marquess of Bute, the Crichton-Stuarts.
The Rhubodach estate on Bute, which includes the western shoreline of the East Kyle was formerly owner by actor and director Lord Attenborough. In August 2009 he placed  estate up for sale, and a referendum carried out on 12 February 2010 showed 93% of islanders supported a plan land to buy the land for the community. In January 2011 he sold the estate, which consists mostly of forest for the reduced fee of £1.48 million. The Rhubodach estate is now owned by the Bute Community Land Company, a charitable company formed by residents living on the island. The main landowner on the western shoreline of the West Kyle is the Ardlamont Forest, which as of 2002 was owned by Loch Lomond Distillery. A viewpoint and indicator on the A8003 road overlooking the Kyles belongs to the National Trust for Scotland.

Gallery

References

External links
 Kyles Athletic
 Colintraive

 
National scenic areas of Scotland
Bodies of water of Scotland
Landforms of Argyll and Bute
Channels of the United Kingdom
Cowal